

Shen may refer to:
 Shen (Chinese religion) (神), a central word in Chinese philosophy, religion, and traditional Chinese medicine; term for god or spirit
 Shen (clam-monster) (蜃), a shapeshifting Chinese dragon believed to create mirages
 Shenendehowa Central School District, abbreviated as Shen
 Shen ring, an Ancient Egyptian hieroglyphic symbol, a form of cartouche

Surnames
 Shěn (surname), the most common Chinese surname Shen (沈)
 Shēn (surname), Chinese surname Shen (申)
 Shèn (surname), Chinese surname Shen (慎)

Places
 Shen, an ancient place in Israel/Palestine (mentioned in )
 Shen County (莘县), in Shandong, China
 State of Shen, (申国) Chinese vassal state during the Zhou dynasty
 Shen (申) or Shēnchéng (申城, City of Shen), an alternate name of Shanghai
 Shenyang (沈阳), a city in Liaoning, China

Entertainment
 Shen (character), a character in Ender's Game
 Shén, a fictional race from the world of Tékumel
 Shen, a character from Blade: The Series
 Shen, Original Shen or OriginalShen, video game broadcaster on Twitch
 Lord Shen, a character from Kung Fu Panda 2
 Tang Shen, a  character from the Teenage Mutant Ninja Turtles franchise
Shen (cartoonist), creator of Shen Comix and Bluechair

See also
Sheng (disambiguation)